The surname Newsom may refer to:

 Bobo Newsom (1907–1962), American baseball player
 Carroll Vincent Newsom (1904–1990), American former president of New York University
 Christopher Newsom (1983–2007), American victim of a kidnapping and murder
 David Newsom (born 1962), American actor and photographer
 David Newsom (cricketer) (born 1937), English cricketer and Royal Navy officer
 David D. Newsom (1918–2008), former U.S. Assistant Secretary of State for African Affairs (1969–1974)
 Eric D. Newsom, American diplomat and State Department official
 Gavin Newsom (born 1967), American Democratic politician and Governor of California since 2019
 Jennifer Siebel Newsom (born 1974), American documentary filmmaker and First Lady of California since 2019
 Jerry Newsom (born 1946), American former collegiate basketball player
 Joanna Newsom (born 1982), American musician and songwriter
 Lee Ann Newsom, Associate Professor of Anthropology at Penn State University
 Leo Dale Newsom  (1915–1987), American entomologist
 Rick Newsom (1950–1988), NASCAR Winston Cup driver
 Tommy Newsom (1929–2007), American saxophone player in the NBC Orchestra on The Tonight Show Starring Johnny Carson
 William Newsom (1933–2018), former state appeals court judge and father of Gavin Newsom

See also